Yellow-nosed albatross may refer to:

Birds of genus Thalassarche: 
 Atlantic yellow-nosed albatross, T. chlororhynchos
 Indian yellow-nosed albatross, T. carteri